The Six Kalimah (  al-kalimāt as-sitt, also spelled qalmah), also known as the Six Traditions or the Six Phrases, are six Islamic phrases (prayers) often recited by Muslims. The phrases are taken in part from hadiths.

Recitation of the Six Kalimahs is taught in South Asian Muslim Schools. In Islam the kalimahs are not restricted to only 6 however in South Asia (and only South Asia) they have restricted the kalimahs to 6.

Contents

See also

Dhikr
Tasbih
Tahmid
Tahlil
Takbir
Tasmiyah
Salawat
Peace be upon him
Shahadah
Adhan

References

Islam in India